State Route 355 (SR 355) is a state highway in Kingsport, Sullivan County, Tennessee.

Route description
SR 355 begins at an intersection with SR 126 just south of downtown Kingsport and travels northwestward through an industrial area and follows closely to some railroad tracks.

After  the railroad crosses over SR 355 and SR 355 continues northwestward.

It then junctions with Netherland Inn Road at a roundabout and turns eastward on to West Center Street and comes to end at SR 36 in downtown Kingsport.

Major junctions

References

355
Transportation in Sullivan County, Tennessee
Kingsport, Tennessee